Globonautes macropus is a species of crab in the family Potamonautidae, the only species in the genus Globonautes. It is found in Guinea and Liberia and presumably in Sierra Leone, and is listed as an endangered species on the IUCN Red List. It lives in tree hollows filled with water, in closed-canopy rainforest.

References

Potamoidea
Freshwater crustaceans of Africa
Monotypic arthropod genera
Taxonomy articles created by Polbot